The 2014 UEFA Europa League Final was the final match of the 2013–14 UEFA Europa League, the 43rd season of Europe's secondary club football tournament organised by UEFA, and the fifth season since it was renamed from the UEFA Cup to the UEFA Europa League. It was played at the Juventus Stadium in Turin, Italy on 14 May 2014, between Spanish side Sevilla and Portuguese side Benfica. Sevilla won the match 4–2 on penalties, following a 0–0 draw after extra time.

Sevilla secured their third title in eight years, after winning the competition in 2006 and 2007. With this triumph, they joined Juventus (1977, 1990, 1993), Inter Milan (1991, 1994, 1998) and Liverpool (1973, 1976, 2001) as the teams with the most wins. Benfica lost their second consecutive UEFA Europa League final, following their defeat against Chelsea in the 2013 final. Including their runner-up finish in 1983, Benfica are the team with the most lost finals in the competition.

As the winners, Sevilla earned the right to play against 2013–14 UEFA Champions League winners Real Madrid in the 2014 UEFA Super Cup.

Venue
The Juventus Stadium in Turin, Italy, was chosen as the venue of the match at a UEFA Executive Committee meeting in Istanbul, Turkey, on 20 March 2012. It is the home stadium of Juventus since 2011. This was the first time that a one-legged final was hosted in Turin. Previous UEFA Cup finals contested over two legs have had one of their matches played in Turin. The first legs of the 1977 UEFA Cup Final and the 1990 UEFA Cup Final, both contested by Juventus, were played at the Stadio Comunale (now the Stadio Olimpico di Torino). The first leg of the 1992 UEFA Cup Final, contested by Torino, and the second leg of the 1993 UEFA Cup Final, contested by Juventus, were played at the Stadio delle Alpi, which has been demolished to make way for the Juventus Stadium.

Background
After a comeback by their opponents Valencia, who had lost the first leg 2–0, Sevilla secured their presence in the final after Stéphane Mbia's injury-time header qualified them on away goals. Sevilla had previously played in two UEFA Cup finals, winning both times in 2006 and 2007, and were aiming to become the fourth team to win three UEFA Cup/Europa League titles, after Juventus, Inter Milan and Liverpool.

Benfica reached their second consecutive Europa League final, after defeating Juventus 2–1 on aggregate and denying their opponents a chance to play the final at their home stadium. It was the first time a club has reached consecutive finals in the competition, having featured in the Champions League group stage on each occasion. Both of their previous UEFA Cup/Europa League finals, in 1983 and 2013, ended in defeats. They had also played in seven European Cup finals (1961, 1962, 1963, 1965, 1968, 1988, 1990). After winning successive European titles in 1961 and 1962, they had lost seven straight major European finals.

The final was Sevilla's 19th match in the competition, having started their participation in the third qualifying round against Montenegrin side Mladost Podgorica. They only qualified for the competition after Málaga were banned and Rayo Vallecano were denied a UEFA license. Benfica transitioned from the Champions League group stage, after finishing third in their group, behind Paris Saint-Germain and Olympiacos. They became the first team to reach the Europa League final without conceding a defeat, registering six wins and two draws in eight knockout phase matches.

The only previous meeting between Sevilla and Benfica in European competition was in the 1957–58 European Cup preliminary round. The first leg at Estadio de Nervión, won by Sevilla 3–1, marked the European debut of both clubs. The second leg at Estádio da Luz ended 0–0, giving Sevilla the victory on aggregate, and they later reached the quarter-finals before losing to eventual champions Real Madrid.

Road to the final

Note: In all results below, the score of the finalist is given first (H: home; A: away).

Pre-match

Ambassador

Former Italy international and Juventus player Ciro Ferrara, who won the UEFA Cup in 1989 with Napoli, was named as the ambassador for the final.

Logo
UEFA unveiled the visual identity of the final on 30 August 2013, the same day as the group stage draw.

Ticketing
The international ticket sales phase for the general public ran from 27 February to 25 March 2014. Tickets were available in four price categories: €150, €100, €70, and €45.

Officials
German referee Felix Brych was named by UEFA on 7 May 2014 as the referee of the final. The rest of the refereeing team are fellow countrymen Mark Borsch and Stefan Lupp as assistant referees, Tobias Welz and Bastian Dankert as additional assistant referees, Thorsten Schiffner as reserve assistant referee, and Serbia's Milorad Mažić as the fourth official.

Match

Team selection
Benfica were not able to play either Enzo Pérez or Lazar Marković, both of whom were sent off in the second leg of their semi-final. Eduardo Salvio, who was booked in that match, was also suspended.

Summary 
At full-time, the game was locked at 0–0. After a further 30 minutes of extra time, both sides were still scoreless. This meant the match was the first final to end goalless and the first to be decided by penalty shoot outs. Sevilla won the penalty shoot out 4–2, their goals coming from Carlos Bacca, Stéphane Mbia, Coke and Kevin Gameiro. Lima and Luisão scored for Benfica, while Sevilla goalkeeper Beto saved goals from Óscar Cardozo and Rodrigo. Paul Gardner writing for Soccer America opined that the assistant referee standing on the goal line allowed Beto to advance too far when he saved the two goals and that Benfica should have been allowed to take the shots again.

Details

Statistics

See also
Sevilla FC in European football
S.L. Benfica in international football

References

External links
2013–14 UEFA Europa League
2014 final: Turin

2014
Final
Uefa Europa League Final
Uefa Europa League Final 2014
Uefa Europa League Final 2014
Uefa Europa League Final 2014
Uefa Europa League Final 2014
Uefa Europa League Final
Uefa Europa League Final
Uefa Cup Final 2014
May 2014 sports events in Europe
Football in Turin
2010s in Turin